Ewald Schnug (born 7 September 1954) is a German agricultural scientist, university lecturer and researcher specialised in Plant nutrition and Soil science.

Life 
Schnug was born in Hachenburg, Westerwald, the first child of the master gardener Ewald Schnug and his wife Marianne, née Haas. He grew up at the parental nursery in Altenkirchen, Westerwald. He was baptised a Catholic, was an altar boy from 1960 to 1968 and a member of the parish council St. Jakobus in Altenkirchen from 1970 to 1971. In the early 1970s he was a member of the junior squad of the Christian Democratic Union of Germany in its Altenkirchen district association and the local branch of the German Life Saving Association. He was married from 1975 to 2006 and is father of three daughters. His formative life-teachers wer the evangelic theologian Fritz Beckmann, the visual artist Carl Lambertz  and the anthroposophist Maria Thun. Zenith of his non-work projects was the restoration and transformation of the UNESCO world heritage "Oberes Wasserloch" in Goslar into the ‘Glucsburgh‘, which is his residence and international meeting point for young scientists and artists. In 2014 the Sparkasse foundation in Lower Saxony awarded him the price for monument preservation.

Education and scientific career 
Schnug attended the catholic primary school in Altenkirchen and completed A levels in the natural science branch in 1974 at the local Westerwald grammar school. There he also edited his first book about the first Comprehensive school in the district.
In 1978 he received his diploma in the discipline plant production at Christian-Albrechts-Universität zu Kiel
In 1982 he completed his doctorate with Dr. sc. agr. at the Faculty of Agriculture in Kiel where he completed also his DSc in 1989. In 1992 he was awarded the title Dr. rer. nat. habil. by the Faculty of Natural Science of Technischen Universität Carolo Wilhelmina zu Braunschweig. The university lecturers who moulded his education were the agronomists Arnold Finck  and Gerhard Geisler, the quantum physicist Evert Jan Post,  the agricultural chemist Erwin Welte and the chemist Meinhart H. Zenk.

Career 
Ewald Schnug worked at the Institute of Plant Nutrition and Soil Science of Christian Albrechts University in Kiel from 1979 to 1992.  He was a scientific staff member until 1983 before he became academic assistant until 1989 and finally senior scientific assistant until 1992. From 1982 to 1990 he lectured Applied Chemistry at the Technical College for Agriculture in Rendsburg. In 1984 he founded the ‘Institut für landwirtschaftliche und landökologische Innovationen und Technologien‘ (ILLIT) Ltd. Kiel and he remained associate and director until 1994 R & D, CEO vorstand. From 1990 to 1992 he completed teaching and research stays as a scholarship holder of the Heisenberg foundation in Newcastle upon Tyne and Aberdeen.
In 1992 he became head of the Institute of Plant Nutrition and Soil Science Bundesforschungsanstalt für Landwirtschaft in Braunschweig (FAL) and since 2008 head of the Institute for Crop and Soil Science of the Federal Research Institute for Cultivated Plants, Julius Kühn-Institut in Braunschweig/Quedlinburg. Since 1992 he is professor and member of the Natural Science Faculty of Carolo-Wilhelmina University in Braunschweig (nowadays Faculty of Life Sciences). 
1995–2014, he represented Germany in the agricultural working groups of HELCOM (Baltic Marine Environment Protection Commission) of BALTIC21; from 1998 to 2013 he was chairman of the working group. A significant achievement was the formulation of Annex III of the HELSINKI Convention. Since 1996 he is working for the International Scientific Centre for Fertilizers and Fertilization (CIEC) which was founded in 1933 in Rome. From June 1996 to September 2010 he was vice-president for research and strategic planning, hereafter first German President of the society and since September 2019 its second Honorary President. From 1993 to 2010 he was a personally appointed member of the Scientific Advisory Board on Fertiliser Issues (BMEL), from 2004 to 2020 (founding) member of the Commission Soil Protection at the German Environment Agency (UBA) and is since 2007 scientific adviser for Germany in the German/Egyptian Research Fund (GERF). End of May 2020 he retired regularly at JKI. Since then he is again appointed CEO of ILLIT.

Awards 

 1982: Faculty price at the Faculty of Agriculture at Christian Albrechts University in Kiel
 1984: Scholarship of the German-Finnish-Society 
 1990: Scholarship of Werner-Heisenberg-Foundation
 2008: Honorary doctorate (Dr. h.c.) of the Romanian Academy of Agricultural and Forestry Sciences ‘Gheorghe Ionescu-Şişeşti’
 2016: Nomination of Visiting Professor of the ‘China Stabilized Fertilizer Technology Innovation Strategic Alliance’ in Shenyang, China
 2016: Nomination of Visiting Professor at the ‘Institute of Applied Ecology’ of the Chinese Academy of Sciences in Shenyang, China
 2019: Appointment Honorary President of CIEC for life (Internationales wissenschaftliches Zentrum für Düngung, Shenyang China)
 2019: Award of the Chinese Province Liaoning for International Scientific and Technological Cooperation 
 2020: Award for International Scientific Cooperation of the Chinese Academy of Sciences (CAS)
 2021: "Distinguished Scientists Award - President's International Fellowship for Distinguished Scientists" of the Chinese Academy of Sciences (CAS)
 2022: "Visiting Scientist" at the Chinese Chinese Academy of Sciences (CAS)

Main research and milestone achievements (Selection) 
Schnug's research portfolio covers investigations of ecological and agronomic aspects from light elements such as nitrogen, sulphur and boron to heavy metals like iron, manganese, zinc, copper, molybdenum and uranium. Besides research on these chemical-material research topics, he is one of the pioneers of Precision agriculture.

Schnug discovered 1980 in Schleswig-Holstein (Northern Germany) for the first time symptoms of severe sulphur deficiency in oilseed rape on production fields, a phenomenon unknown until then because of high atmospheric sulphur deposits Acid rain.

In 1986 Schnug developed the X-ray fluorescence method for the determination of the Glucosinolate-(GSL) content of rapeseed, which was employed already in 1987 nationwide during the harvest period of oilseed rape in order to differentiate old (high glucosinolate containing) (0-oilseed rape) cultivars from new (low glucosinolate containing (00-oilseed rape) varieties. In the same year he published the scientific proof that sulphur fertilisation increases the glucosinolate content of oilseed rape seeds. He refined the X-ray fluorescence method in 1988 so that it was possible to determine the glucosinolate content in oilseed rape seeds already before harvest and it now allowed also to assess the total glucosinolate content of extracted rapeseed meal.

Since 1999 Ewald Schnug worked on Uran in the environment, he investigated the uranium content in tap-and mineral waters  and uranium contamination of soils caused by phosphorus fertilizatio 
In addition, Schnug organized a Workshop which addressed health and ecological problems of uranium and a Conference on the problem of uranium contamination by fertilizer practices in agriculture. At this event u. a. the Secondary electronstheory was postulated as the causal reason for the synergistic effect of radiological and chemical toxicity of uranium and the energy neutral production of clean phosphorus fertilisers by extracting native uranium from phosphate rock was suggested.

 In 1981 Schnug showed for the first time that elemental sulfur reduces plant availability of iron in soils which opposed the common fertilization doctrine; he discovers a N/Fe+Zn synergism, a S/Mo antagonism and a Mo/Cu antagonism in plants.
 In 1982 Schnug proved that soil acidifying fertilisation improves the manganese supply of agricultural crops. Schnug also first time in plant nutrition research employed for statistical analysis of agricultural data principal component and discriminant analysis and found that there is no physiological P/Zn antagonism in plants.
 In 1984 Schnug discovers that silicon fertilisation reduces the infection rate with pathogens.
 In 1985 Schnug quantifies for the first time the atmospheric sulphur deposition on soils in Germany. He is also the first to address the significance of the regional variability of features of soil fertility for fertilisation.
 In 1986 he gives first time a practical demonstration of the Global Positioning System (GPS) applied in an agricultural measure on the experimental station Birkenmoor in Schleswig-Holstein (Germany) and provides evidence that it is severe sulphur deficiency causing symptoms of white flowering oilseed rape  in the same year, together with the company Müller Elektronik in Salzkottenhe presents for the first time a Global Positioning System (GPS) of the company SEL, implemented for the use in agriculture, at the field days of the German Agricultural Society (DLG).
 In 1987 Schnug coins the term "Computer Aided Farming" (CAF), but the science community later on preferred the term Precision agriculture.
 In 1988 he starts his studies on uranium in rock phosphates. In the same year he identifies wheat varieties with an adverse P/Mn acquisition capacity and he discovers that glucosinolates are a sulphur pool in Brassica crops that can be re-utilised, and he postulates that a metabolic causal chain between S-supply-GSH/GSSG/-Myrosinase-GSL/DGSL (S-supply - Halliwell cycles - GSL-degradation)..
 In 1989 Schnug determines for the first time the spatial distribution of Miscanthus yield by remote sensing, demonstrates in Birkenmoor, Schleswig-Holstein, the worldwide first application of GPS on a production field and assesses firstly ‘equifertiles’, zones of similar soil fertility.
 In 1991 Schnug publishes the first yield map generated on a combine harvester in real time on a farm. The technical equipment he developed together with the Danish companies Dronningborg and Thoustrup & Overgaard. This was presented to the public in the same year firstly at the AGRITECHNICA in Frankfurt. In the same year he designed the first commercial agricultural Geo-Information-System ‘LORIS’ (LOcal Resource Information System). LORIS which has been patented later without his consent by the Finnish company KEMIRA  and subsequently exploited commercially. In 1991 he also discovers on a field in the vicinity of Darry in Schleswig-Holstein for the first time severe sulphur deficiency in winter wheat in Germany.
 In 1992 Schnug comprises his research data on critical nutrient concentrations and functions of essential plant nutrients for crop yield in the software programme PIPPA (Professional Interpretation Program for Plant Analysis)  which has been internationally acknowledged and adopted after publication of the source code. In the same year he hypothesised that a significant amount of phosphates discharged into surface waters is caused by ‘light-particle’ erosion and he quantifies firstly the impact of the sulphur supply on the baking volume of breadmaking wheat.
 In 1993 Schnug implements with the work area ‘Local Resource Management’ worldwide for the first time research into the agro-chemical basics of Precision agriculture in the conception of an Institute of Federal Research.
 In 1994 Schnug develops the concept of monitor pedo cells which enable the efficient collection of spatial distributed data.
 In 1995 Schnug develops ‘BOLIDES (Boundary Line Developing System)‘, a mathematical routine for assessing threshold functions between agronomic parameters.
 In 1996 Schnug published a paper about the use of Coca-Cola™ as an extractant for the determination of plant available heavy metals in soils.
 In 1997 Schnug developed concept and technologies for the semi-orthogonal remote surveillance of fields by ’Surf-Eyes’ and ‘LASSIE (Low Altitude Stationary Surveillance Instrumental Equipment)’ , long before UAVs became available for civilians. In the same year he co-initiated the COST Action No. 829 ‘Fundamental, agronomical and environmental aspects of sulphur nutrition and assimilation in plants’ and had been the German representative in the management committee until the project terminated in 2003.
 In 1998 Schnug establishes with ‘Agro Precise‘ the first international journal for Precision agriculture which was published by Herbert Daybell Publications Ltd. in Bottesford, UK.

 In 2000 Schnug develops MOPS (MOdel for Predicting Sulphur-deficiency), a model for the prognosis of sulphur deficiency on agricultural soils.
 In 2001 Schnug coins the term ‘Sulphur-Induced Resistance’ (SIR) which will become a major focus in the research portfolio of his institute.
 In 2002 torrential rain and floodings at the start of the new millennium motivated Schnug to develop a new concept for the preventive flood protection by organic farming which is known by its acronym ‘HOT‘ (Help of Organics against Torrents), but until now this concept is stiil to become  part of structural land use planning despite continuously increasing risks of severe floodings as a result of climate change and industrialization of agriculture. Also in 2002 ‘Spatial speciation’ (= spatial variability of extractability of chemical elements in soils) becomes a new research area initiated by Schnug that provides basic scientific data for Precision agriculture. In the same year, he publishes his innovative concept to improve the solubility of rock phosphates by combining it with elemental sulphur.
 In 2003 Schnug hypothesises that the spatial distribution of mistletoe bearing trees is an indicator for heavy metal pollution of soils. His research team also discovers that it is the managnese supply of oak trees which is significant for a successful infestation with the half parasite and finally the synthesis of oncologically highly efficient pharmaceuticals.
 In 2006 Schnug discovers that Phosphonite-containing fungicides may cause lethal phosphorus deficiency, a fact opposed by received opinion that rates them as a nutrient source.
 In 2012 the German Environment Agency (UBA) publishes Schnug's limit values for uranium in fertilisers  which had been presented already 6 years earlier to the Federal Ministry of Agriculture. Through influence by the agricultural lobby uranium is still the only toxic heavy metal not regulated in fertilizer laws. 
 In 2013 Schnug introduced the new concept of ’Nutrient-Induced Competition‘ for sustainable weed control.
 In 2016 the German Environment Agency (UBA) publishes his concept ‘HOT‘ for the preventive flood protection by organic farming.

Teaching 
Schnug mentored 80 PhD's at German and international universities, 10 of his scholars habilitated and became appointed at international Universities.

Publications (Selection) 
 Multivariate statistische Verfahren als Hilfsmittel zur Auswertung mehrfaktorieller Düngungsversuche am Beispiel der Faktorenanalyse. In: VDLUFA-Schriftenreihe. 16, 1986, S. 615–624.
 mit S. Haneklaus: Indirekte Bestimmung des Gesamtglucosinolatgehaltes von Rapssamen mittels Röntgenfluoreszenzanalyse. In: Fresenius Z. Anal. Chem. 326, 1987, S. 441–445.
 mit H. Beringer: Sulphur in Agro-Ecosystems. (Mineral Nutrition in Ecosystems, 2). Kluwer Academic Publ. Dordrecht, 1998, S. 1–38.
 mit S. Haneklaus: Sulphur deficiency symptoms in oilseed rape (Brassica Napus L.) – The aesthetics of starvation. In: Phyton. 45(3), 2005, S. 79–95.
 mit S. Haneklaus, L. J. De Kok, I. Stulen und E. Bloem: Sulfur. In: Barker and Pilbeam (Hrsg.): Handbook of Plant Nutrition. CRC Press, Boca Raton, Florida 2006, S. 183–238.
 mit S. Haneklaus: Site specific nutrient management – objectives, current status and future research needs. In: A. Srinivasan (Hrsg.): Precision Farming – A global perspective. Marcel Dekker, New York, 2006, S. 91–151.
 mit S. Haneklaus und E. Bloem: Sulfur and Plant Disease. In: Datnoff u. a. (Hrsg.): Mineral Nutrition and Plant disease. APS Press Minneapolis MN USA, 2007, S. 101–118.
 mit L. J. De Kok: Loads and fate of fertilizer derived uranium. Backhuys Publishers, Leiden 2008.
 Uran in Phosphor-Düngemitteln und dessen Verbleib in der Umwelt. In: Strahlentelex. 612–613, 2012, S. 1–8.
 mit N. Haneklaus, H. Tulsidas und B. Tyobeka: High Temperature Gas-Cooled Reactors Enable Closed Phosphate Fertilizer Production. In: Dawei Zheng (Hrsg.): Proceeding of the International Conference on Frontiers of Environment, Energy and Bioscience. 2013, ISBN 978-1-60595-133-1, S. 792–798.
 Fertilizer derived uranium and its thread to human health. In: Environmental Science & Technology 47, 2013, S. 2433–2434, doi:10.1021/es4002357.
 mit A..E. Ulrich, H.-M. Prasser und E. Frossard: Uranium endowments in phosphate rock. In: Science of the Total Environment. 478, 2014, S. 226–234, doi:10.1016/j.scitotenv.2014.01.069.
 mit L.J. De Kok (2016): Phosphorus in Agriculture: 100% Zero Springer, ISBN 978-94-017-7612-7.
 mit S. Haneklaus (2016): Glucosinolates – The Agricultural Story. In: Kopriva, S. (ed.) Glucosinolates Advances in Botanica Research, 80, 281–302, 2016 Elsevier Ltd., ISBN 978-0-08-100327-5.

Literature 
 Feldhoff, H. und Gneist, C.: Ewald Schnug in Westerwälder Köpfe – 33 Porträts herausragender Persönlichkeiten Rhein Mosel Verlag, Zell/Mosel 2014, ISBN 978-3-89801-073-3, S. 147–150.

External links 

 Liste der Publikationen von Ewald Schnug
 Ewald Schnug bei Researchgate

References 

Living people
1954 births